A magnitude 6.8 earthquake struck Myanmar  west of Chauk on 24 August 2016 with a maximum Mercalli intensity of VI (Strong). It struck at 5:04 pm local time (10:34 UTC), and was centered in an isolated area. The estimated depth was 84.1 km. Tremors from the earthquake were felt in Yangon, in the eastern cities of Patna, Guwahati, and Kolkata in India, in Bangkok in Thailand and in Dhaka, the capital of Bangladesh. According to reports, several temples in the nearby ancient city of Bagan were damaged and four people were reported dead.

See also
 List of earthquakes in 2016
 List of earthquakes in Myanmar

References

External links 

2016 earthquakes
2016 in Bangladesh
2016 disasters in India
2016 in Myanmar
2016 in Thailand
Earthquakes in Bangladesh
Earthquakes in India
Earthquakes in Myanmar
Earthquakes in Thailand
August 2016 events in Asia
2016 disasters in Bangladesh
2016 disasters in Asia
2016 disasters in Myanmar
2016 disasters in Thailand